Michael Johnson is a Missouri politician serving as a member of the Missouri House of Representatives from the 23rd district. He succeeded fellow Democrat Barbara Washington.

Missouri House of Representatives

Committee assignments 

 Economic Development
 Health and Mental Health Policy
 Insurance

Source:

Electoral history

References

Living people
Democratic Party members of the Missouri House of Representatives
Year of birth missing (living people)